Alexander Eig (1894, near Minsk, Belarus – 30 July 1938, Jerusalem, Mandatory Palestine) was a botanist, one of the first plant researchers in Israel, head of the department of Botany at the Hebrew University in Jerusalem and co-founder of the National Botanic Garden of Israel on Mount Scopus campus.

Biography

Alexander Eig was born in Schedrin near Minsk. He used to wander in the forests and join his family on hunting and fishing expeditions observing the plants  around.  At the age of 15 he immigrated to Palestine, where he became a student at Mikveh Israel agricultural school.

In 1925 he was invited by Otto Warburg to join the agricultural experimental station in Tel Aviv, where he worked with Michael Zohary. A year later, the unit moved to Jerusalem, and they joined the staff of the Hebrew University of Jerusalem. That year he married Itta Faktorovsky, the sister of his closest friend and fellow botanist Elazar Faktorovsky.

In 1931 he graduated with his Ph.D., and founded the Botanic Garden on Mount Scopus, together with Zohary and Naomi Feinbrun-Dothan. On 1932 he started teaching botany. Among his students were the brothers Aaron and Ephraim Katzir.

On 1937 he was invited by Yitzhak Ben-Zvi to testify before the Peel Commission, on the question of whether the country could  sustain a large population. He was later asked to prepare a map that would serve the arguments of the Zionist side in the international arena.

Eig died of cancer in 1938, at the age of less than 44 years. He was buried in the Mount of Olives Jewish Cemetery. His gravestone bears the inscription "The creator of plant science in Israel." He was eulogized by Moshe Sharett, Hugo Bergmann, Judah Leon Magnes and Yitzhak Ben-Zvi.

Works

Taxonomic patronyms
In honor of Alexander Eig, four taxonomic patronyms were given in plants with names of genus, species and subspecies:
 Eigia longistyla (Eig) Soják 
 Bellevalia eigii 
 Poa eigii 
 Salvia eigii 
 Ornithogalum neurostegium subsp. eigii (Feinbrun) Feinbrun

References

1894 births
1938 deaths
Israeli botanists
Jewish biologists
Scientists from Minsk
Deaths from cancer in Israel
Burials at the Jewish cemetery on the Mount of Olives
Academic staff of the Hebrew University of Jerusalem
Emigrants from the Russian Empire to the Ottoman Empire
Natural history of Palestine (region)